The Angels Radio Network is a network of 7 radio stations that air Major League Baseball games of the Los Angeles Angels of Anaheim. , 6 stations broadcast games in English, while another broadcasts them in Spanish.

English

The English announcers are Terry Smith on play-by-play and Mark Langston with color commentary.

Radio affiliates

Spanish
A separate network airs games in Spanish.

See also
 List of XM Satellite Radio channels
 List of Sirius Satellite Radio stations
 List of Los Angeles Angels broadcasters

References

Los Angeles Angels of Anaheim
Major League Baseball on the radio
Mass media in Los Angeles County, California
Mass media in Orange County, California
Sports radio networks in the United States